Paiguano or Paihuano is a small agricultural town and commune in the Elqui Province of the Coquimbo Region of Chile.

Demographics
According to the 2002 census of the National Statistics Institute, Paiguano had 4,168 inhabitants (2,145 men and 2,023 women), making the commune an entirely rural area. The population grew by 10.5% (396 persons) between the 1992 and 2002 censuses.

Administration
As a commune, Paiguano is a third-level administrative division of Chile administered by a municipal council, headed by an alcalde who is directly elected every four years.

Within the electoral divisions of Chile, Paiguano is represented in the Chamber of Deputies by Mr. Mario Bertolino (RN) and Marcelo Díaz (PS) as part of the 7th electoral district, (together with La Serena, La Higuera, Vicuña and Andacollo). The commune is represented in the Senate by Evelyn Matthei Fornet (UDI) and Jorge Pizarro Soto (PDC) as part of the 4th senatorial constituency (Coquimbo Region).

Patriotic Celebrations
Paiguano is one of the main locations to celebrate Chile's patriotic holiday on September 18th.

See also
 List of towns in Chile

External links 
 Ilustre Municipalidad de Paihuano
 Turismo Valle del Elqui.

References

Geography of Coquimbo Region
Communes of Chile
Populated places in Elqui Province